For a Few Bullets is a 2016 Chinese comedy western film directed by Peter Pan Anzi and starring Lin Gengxin, Zhang Jingchu and Liu Xiaoqing. It was released in China by Wanda Shengshi Film Distribution in IMAX on July 15, 2016.

Plot
When a professional thief sees his lifetime goal of being the best potentially realized in stealing a rare artifact, he finds himself entangled in a worldwide plot involving the Soviets, the Japanese, and a band of outsiders. It's up to him and a special agent to save the world!

Cast
Lin Gengxin
Zhang Jingchu
Tengger
Liu Xiaoqing
Vivian Dawson
Kenneth Tsang
Vicky Chen
Shi Yufei

Production

Reception
The film has grossed  at the Chinese box office.

References

External links
 
 For A Few Bullets at Rotten Tomatoes

Chinese comedy films
Films directed by Pan Anzi
Films set in the 1930s
IMAX films
2010s Western (genre) comedy films
2016 comedy films